The Royal Order of Sahametrei is a chivalric order conferred by the government of the Kingdom of Cambodia. The Royal Order of Sahametrei was instituted in three classes on 9 September 1948 and was expanded to five classes on 23 August 1956. The order was not used during the Khmer Rouge period and was reinstated on 5 October 1995 by Royal Decree No. 1095/01. It is conferred primarily on foreigners who have rendered distinguished services to the King and to the people of Cambodia, particularly in the field of external relations and diplomatic services or, as a token of friendship.

The Royal Order of Sahametrei is part of the Cambodia's honours system which currently includes the Royal Order of Monisaraphon, the Royal Order of Cambodia and the Royal Order of Sowathara. The Grand Cross and Grand Officer is presented as a sash worn over the right shoulder. The Commander class of the Royal Order of Sahametrei is a neck order and is suspended from a cravat that is worn around the neck. The badge of the Officer and Knight are worn on the left breast.

History
The Royal Order of Sahametrei was established by King Norodom Sihanouk on September 9, 1948. It was instituted in three classes but expanded on August 23, 1956 to five classes:
  Maha Sirivudha (មហាសេរីវឌ្ឍន៍) or Grand Cross
  Mahasena (មហាសេនា) or Grand Officer
  Tepidin (ធិបឌិន្ទ) or Commander
  Sena (សេនា) or Officer
  Askararidha (អស្សឫទ្ធិ) or Knight

The order became dormant in 1975 under the government of Democratic Kampuchea. It was reinstituted by Royal Decree No.1095/01 on 5 October 1995 by King Norodom Sihanouk.

Recipients

See also
Cambodian honours system
Royal Order of Monisaraphon

Notes

Orders, decorations, and medals of Cambodia
 
1948 establishments in Cambodia
Awards established in 1948